Mike Haas is a retired American soccer defender who played professionally in the North American Soccer League and Major Indoor Soccer League.  He has also served as an assistant coach with both professional and U.S. national teams.

In 1980, Haas began his professional career with the Dallas Tornado of the North American Soccer League.  That fall, he moved to the Denver Avalanche of the Major Indoor Soccer League for two seasons.  He later played for the Colorado Comets of the USISL.  In 1990, he both played for and served as an assistant coach with the Colorado Foxes of the American Professional Soccer League.

Following his retirement from playing, Haas has coached at the youth level and served as an assistant coach with several U.S. national youth teams.

References

External links
 NASL/MISL stats
 Career overview

1958 births
Living people
American soccer players
American soccer coaches
American Professional Soccer League players
Colorado Comets players
Colorado Foxes players
Dallas Tornado players
Denver Avalanche players
Major Indoor Soccer League (1978–1992) players
North American Soccer League (1968–1984) players
Association football defenders